Greensborough Highway is a highway in the north-eastern suburbs of Melbourne, Australia, and is an important route for north-east Melbourne. This name is not widely known to most drivers, as the entire allocation is still best known as by the names of its constituent parts: Lower Heidelberg Road, Rosanna Road, Lower Plenty Road, Greensborough Road and Greensborough Bypass. This article will deal with the entire length of the corridor for sake of completion, as well to avoid confusion between declarations.

Route
Lower Heidelberg Road starts at the intersection of Heidelberg Road and Upper Heidelberg Road in Ivanhoe and heads east as a four-lane, single-carriageway road through Eaglemont, crossing Banksia Street at Heidelberg (and the beginning of Greenborough Highway), nearly immediately crossing Burgundry Street and changing name to Rosanna Road to Rosanna, where it intersects with and changes name to Lower Plenty Road and widens to a six-lane, dual-carriageway road. It continues north-east, where after a short distance it intersects with and changes name to Greensborough Road, heading north as a four-lane, single-carriageway road until it meets Watsonia Road in Watsonia, changing names to Greensborough Bypass and continues north-east as a six-lane, dual-carriageway road, crossing Grimshaw Street and turning east at the intersection with Metropolitan Ring Road in Greensborough before eventually ending at the roundabout with Diamond Creek Road and Civic Drive.

History
Lower Heidelberg Road and Rosanna Road were signed as Metropolitan Route 44 between Ivanhoe and Yallambie in 1965; Greensborough Road was also signed as Metropolitan Route 46 in 1965, originally turning east along Grimshaw Street to run through Greensborough and along Diamond Creek Road east beyond it. When the Greensborough Bypass was opened in the late 1980s, Metropolitan Route 46 was re-aligned along it to bypass Greensborough and re-join Diamond Creek Road beyond.

In the late 1980s, the northern section of Greensborough Road south of Grimshaw Street was extended and significantly altered, with the original road north of Lenola Street in Macleod re-aligned to the west as a service road, the new road being a divided highway up to a new intersection at Grimshaw Street. North of here the road was extended as a single carriageway bypass road, sweeping north-west around central Greensborough and terminating at a large roundabout interchange with Diamond Creek Road and Civic Drive, known locally (and sign-posted) as the Greensborough Bypass. The original alignment north of Nepean Street was repurposed for local traffic only, still known today as Greensborough Road. Construction on the northern half, the 3 km section between Grimshaw Street and Diamond Creek Road, started in 1985 and opened in March 1988 (this section was later declared a State Highway in 1989); construction on the southern half, the 2 km section between Grimshaw and Lenola Streets, started in late 1985, and opened in September 1989.

The passing of the Transport Act of 1983 (itself an evolution from the original Highways and Vehicles Act of 1924) provided for the declaration of State Highways, roads two-thirds financed by the State government through the Road Construction Authority (later VicRoads). The Greensborough Highway was declared a State Highway in December 1990, from Banksia Street in Heidelberg to Diamond Creek Road in Greensborough (incorporating the newly constructed road previously declared as a State Highway the year before); however the road was still presently known (and signposted) as its constituent parts.

Throughout the 1990s the Metropolitan Ring Road was constructed, terminating at the Greensborough Bypass section of the highway. Around this time, the road north of Grimshaw Street was progressively widened and duplicated, with the final section being a new bridge over the Plenty River, completed in 2005.

The passing of the Road Management Act 2004 granted the responsibility of overall management and development of Victoria's major arterial roads to VicRoads: in 2004, VicRoads re-declared the road as Greensborough Highway (Arterial #6850), from Banksia Street in Heidelberg to Heidelberg-Kinglake Road (known as Diamond Creek Road) in Greensborough; as before, the road is still presently known (and signposted) as its constituent parts.

Timeline of construction
1988: Northern section of Greensborough Bypass, initial 3.5 km of dual-lane, single-carriageway road from Grimshaw Street to Diamond Creek Road, opened 1 March 1988.
1989: Southern section of Greensborough Bypass, 2 km of dual-carriageway road from Grimshaw Street to Yallambie Road, opened September 1989.
1998: Greensborough Bypass duplication, 1.3 km north of Grimshaw Street to Metropolitan Ring Road (including bridge over Kempston Street and provision of additional lane east of Plenty River).
2005: Greensborough Bypass duplication, 1.8 km Metropolitan Ring Road to Diamond Creek Road, including duplication of Plenty River bridge.

1969 Melbourne Transportation Plan 
The route was originally designated in the 1969 Melbourne Transportation Plan as the F18 Freeway, extending further than Diamond Creek Road to finish at Ryans Road, Diamond Creek, and at the southern end extending past Lower Plenty Rd to link up with the Eastern Freeway between Bulleen Road and Burke Road, via the Banyule Flats Reserve.

Future Upgrades 

In recent years, Greensborough Highway has become extremely congested, with sections of the road carrying upwards of 60,000 vehicles per day. The road is one of the only major arterials that connects the north eastern suburbs with the Eastern Freeway (and by extension the Melbourne CBD), with sections of Greensborough Road and Rosanna Road carrying unsustainable amounts of traffic as well as a significant number of trucks within residential areas. The North East Link project, announced in 2016, aims to fix these problems by creating a freeway-grade connection and road tunnels between the Metropolitan Ring Road and the Eastern Freeway in Bulleen, aiming to take vehicles off Greensborough Highway and also involves significant reworking of the northern section of the route. The project began in late 2020 with the tunnels scheduled to begin construction in 2022. The entire project is anticipated to be completed by 2027/2028.

See also

 List of Melbourne highways

References

Highways and freeways in Melbourne
Transport in the City of Banyule
Transport in the Shire of Nillumbik
Heidelberg, Victoria